Carlos Dotson (born September 20, 1996) is an American professional basketball player for U.D. Oliveirense of the Liga Portuguesa de Basquetebol. He played college basketball for the Anderson Trojans, the College of Central Florida Patriots, and the Western Carolina Catamounts.

High school career
Dotson grew up in Riverdale Park, Maryland but moved to South Carolina to attend Paul M. Dorman High School. He was cut from the basketball team as a freshman, but made the team as a sophomore. As a senior, Dotson averaged 13 points and 10 rebounds per game, leading the team to a 20–5 record. He was selected to the North-South All-Star game where he scored 14 points. Dotson also played defensive end on the football team before focusing on basketball. He committed to play college basketball at Anderson, choosing the Trojans over Lincoln Memorial, among other Division II offers.

College career
Dotson played sparingly as a freshman at Anderson as he was hampered by ankle injuries and took a medical redshirt. As a redshirt freshman, he averaged 10.9 points and 8.1 rebounds per game, shooting 56.5 percent from the floor. Dotson earned South Atlantic Conference All-Freshman Team honors. For his sophomore season, he transferred to the College of Central Florida. Dotson averaged 13.3 points and 7.8 rebounds per game for the Patriots while shooting 60.3 percent. He transferred to Western Carolina prior to his junior season. Dotson averaged 13.9 points and 9.5 rebounds per game as a junior, earning Third Team All-SoCon honors. On February 12, 2020, he scored a career-high 32 points and had 12 rebounds in a 82–62 loss to UNC Greensboro. As a senior, Dotson averaged 15.5 points and 9.7 rebounds per game and had 18 double-doubles. He was named to the First Team All-SoCon, the SoCon All-Tournament Team, and the Lou Henson All-America Team.

Professional career
On October 7, 2020, Dotson signed his first professional contract with JSA Bordeaux Basket of the Nationale Masculine 1. In four games, he averaged 7.3 points and 3.0 rebounds per game. On March 10, 2021, Dotson signed with Club Trouville of the Liga Uruguaya de Básquetbol. In the summer of 2021, he joined the Charlotte Tribe of the East Coast Basketball League. On November 26, Dotson signed with U.D. Oliveirense of the Liga Portuguesa de Basquetebol.

Coaching career
Dotson joined Clemson as a graduate assistant for the 2021–22 season. He left the team in late November 2021 to continue his professional career.

Career statistics

College

NCAA Division I

|-
| style="text-align:left;"| 2018–19
| style="text-align:left;"| Western Carolina
| 31 || 28 || 27.7 || .596 || .000 || .526 || 9.5 || 1.5 || .7 || .5 || 13.9
|-
| style="text-align:left;"| 2019–20
| style="text-align:left;"| Western Carolina
| 30 || 29 || 27.2 || .610 || – || .573 || 9.7 || 1.9 || .6 || .2 || 15.5
|- class="sortbottom"
| style="text-align:center;" colspan="2"| Career
| 61 || 57 || 27.5 || .603 || .000 || .551 || 9.6 || 1.7 || .7 || .3 || 14.7

NCAA Division II

|-
| style="text-align:left;"| 2015–16
| style="text-align:left;"| Anderson
| 4 || 0 || 7.0 || .600 || – || .286 || 1.3 || .3 || .0 || .3 || 2.0
|-
| style="text-align:left;"| 2016–17
| style="text-align:left;"| Anderson
| 29 || 29 || 26.1 || .565 || – || .486 || 8.1 || .3 || .8 || .6 || 10.9
|- class="sortbottom"
| style="text-align:center;" colspan="2"| Career
| 33 || 29 || 23.8 || .565 || – || .475 || 7.3 || .3 || .7 || .6 || 9.8

JUCO

|-
| style="text-align:left;"| 2017–18
| style="text-align:left;"| College of Central Florida
| 32 || 32 || 24.5 || .603 || .000 || .530 || 7.8 || .8 || 1.0 || .4 || 13.3

References

External links
Western Carolina Catamounts bio
College of Central Florida Patriots bio
Anderson Trojans bio

1996 births
Living people
American men's basketball players
American expatriate basketball people in France
American expatriate basketball people in Uruguay
Anderson Trojans men's basketball players
College of Central Florida Patriots men's basketball players
Western Carolina Catamounts men's basketball players
Basketball players from Maryland
People from Riverdale Park, Maryland
Power forwards (basketball)